Erik Håker (born 4 March 1952) was the first Norwegian alpine skier to win a World Cup event. He has done that in 1971, and won four more events in 1972–1978. In 1979 he was awarded the Holmenkollen medal. Håker competed at the 1972, 1976 and 1980 Winter Olympics with the best result of fifth place in the downhill in 1972.

FIS Alpine Ski World Cup victories

References

External links

 – click Holmenkollmedaljen for downloadable pdf file 
Norway skiing history
Sapporo 1972 Olympic results 
TV Profile 

1952 births
Alpine skiers at the 1972 Winter Olympics
Alpine skiers at the 1976 Winter Olympics
Alpine skiers at the 1980 Winter Olympics
Holmenkollen medalists
Living people
Norwegian male alpine skiers
Olympic alpine skiers of Norway